The Danish Ministry of Taxation is a Ministry, headed by the Danish Tax Minister. The responsibilities of the ministry includes supporting the Tax Minister, and formulating new laws regarding taxes to be voted on by the Folketing.

Organisation

External links
Official website

Government ministries of Denmark